The ship types in service with the People's Liberation Army Navy (PLAN) include aircraft carriers, submarines, (both nuclear and conventional), amphibious transport docks, landing ships, tank, landing ships, medium, destroyers, frigates, corvettes, missile boats, submarine chasers, gunboats, mine countermeasures vessels, replenishment oilers and the various auxiliaries.

All ships and submarines currently in commission with the Navy were built in China, with the exception of s, s and aircraft carrier , as these vessels originated from either Russia or Ukraine.

Ship naming conventions

Ships of PLAN are named per Naval Vessels Naming Regulation that was first issued by the Central Military Commission (CMC) on November 3, 1978, and subsequently revised July 7, 1986.
The convention for naming naval ships is as follows; 
 Aircraft carriers are named after provinces.
 Nuclear-powered submarines are all named Changzheng (Long March) along with a number.
 Destroyers and frigates are named after cities.
 Smaller anti-submarine ships are named for counties.
 Tank landing ships and dock landing ships carry the names of mountains.
 Infantry landing ships are named for rivers.
 Replenishment ships are named for lakes.

Active ships
There are approximately 500 vessels listed here that constitute the active fleet. Not included here are the various auxiliary ships that together number approximately 230.

 Aircraft carriers - 2 + (1 Fitting Out)
 Landing helicopter docks - 3
 Amphibious transport docks - 8
 Landing ship tanks - 36
 Landing ship medium - 36
 Ballistic missile submarines - 8
 Nuclear attack submarines - 12
 Attack submarines - 58
 Destroyers - 50
 Frigates - 43
 Corvettes - 72
 Missile boats - 107
 Submarine chasers - 26
 Gunboats - 17
 Mine countermeasures vessels - 36
 Replenishment oilers - 16
 Auxiliaries (various) - 233*

* Figure includes both coastal and ocean-going auxiliaries, from tugboats to hospital ships. Not counted towards total number of active ships.

The tables below list the various ships according to their class and date of commission. The newest class of ship is listed first, with proceeding classes listed afterwards, arranged in order of age. Column headings include: "Type" (i.e. Chinese class designation), the types "NATO designation", the ships "Pennant number" (or hull number), the ships name in English and Chinese (Han 中文), ships "Displacement" in tonnes, and the "Fleet" in which it serves (e.g. North Sea Fleet, South Sea Fleet and East Sea Fleet).

The "Status" column is colour coded, <span style="color:green">green</span style="color:green"> indicates relatively new and modern classes in service, while <span style="color:red">red</span style="color:red"> indicates obsolescence and being in the process of decommissioning as newer types are brought into service. A third colour, <span style="color:blue">blue</span style="color:blue">, specifically indicates a ship which is not yet in commission, but has been launched and is in the final stages of construction, or has been handed over for sea trials. Any ships with a status colour of blue is not yet counted towards the total number of active ships.

Submarines

Nuclear ballistic missile submarines

Conventional ballistic missile submarines

Nuclear attack submarines

Conventional attack submarines

Surface ships

Principal Surface Combatants

Aircraft carriers

Destroyers

Frigates

Corvettes

Coastal warfare vessels

Missile boats, submarine chasers and gunboats

Amphibious warfare ships

Major amphibious warfare vessels

Minor amphibious warfare crafts
List of active People's Liberation Army Navy landing craft

Mine warfare vessels
In addition to units in active service, PLAN also keeps a large number (up to several hundreds) of minesweepers in operational reserve, and regularly conducts minecountermeasure exercises.

Auxiliaries 
Unlike warships of PLAN that are named per Naval Vessels Naming Regulation which many PLAN auxiliaries do not follow, but instead, they are designated by a combination of two Chinese characters followed by a two or three-digit number. The first Chinese character denotes which Chinese fleet the ship is service with, with East (Dong, 东) for East Sea Fleet, North (Bei, 北) for North Sea Fleet, and South (Nan, 南) for South Sea Fleet. The second Chinese character is for hull classification, such as Barge (Bo, 驳) for barge, Survey (Ce, 测) for survey vessel, Oil (You, 油) for oil tanker, Repair (Xiu, 修) for repair ship, Rescue (Jiu, 救) for rescue ship, Transport (Yun, 运) for transport & cargo ship, Tuo (tug, 拖) for tugboat, Water (Shui, 水) for water tanker, etc. When auxiliaries are reassigned to a different fleet, their pennant number would change accordingly. Some PLAN naval auxiliaries perform multiple functions and thus are referenced multiple times differently under various hull classifications. Furthermore, when PLAN auxiliaries are tasked to perform certain civilian missions such as in support of civilian research or construction projects, they are sometimes temporarily assigned different pennant numbers for the duration of those missions, thus making the accurate assessment of PLAN auxiliary fleet rather difficult. 

In addition, some PLAN auxiliaries especially research vessels are jointly funded by other civilian agencies of Chinese government, and frequently conduct missions for these civilian agencies/departments, just like the way Protezione Civile funded Italian San Giorgio-class amphibious transport dock of the Italian navy, and thus also performs disaster relief missions in addition to military operations.When these jointly owned and/or funded PLAN naval auxiliaries are subject to civilian agencies/departments & perform missions for them, they are often assigned a different pennant number & name, just as in some cases of PLAN naval auxiliaries are sometimes assigned assigned different pennant numbers when performing certain civilian missions, thus making the accurate count of the PLAN auxiliary fleet even more complicated and difficult. Therefore, list provided here is seldom up-to-date.  For a complete list of auxiliary vessels currently in service with the People's Liberation Army Navy please see the List of PLAN Auxiliaries.(Note that it is a work in progress and often may not yet be complete.)

Ammunition ships

Buoy tenders

Cable layers

Cargo ships

Crane ships

Degaussing/deperming ships

Diving support vessels

Dredgers

Engineering Ships

Environmental research ships

Fleet replenishment

Floating pile drivers

General purpose research ships

Hospital Ships

Hydrographic survey ships

Icebreakers

Museum ships
Museum ships only include those owned by PLAN/People's Liberation Army (PLA)/Chinese Ministry of Defense (CMoD) and thus still on Chinese naval registry, but do not include ships stricken from Chinese naval registry, such as those sold/transferred to local governments and private hands.

Oceanographic research ships

Oceanographic surveillance ships

Personnel Transports

Range support & target ships

Repair ships

Rescue and salvage ships

Spy ships

Submarine support ships

Submersibles
Most submersibles, especially bathyscaphes are civilian agencies owned but also carry out PLAN missions, while some are jointly owned/funded and operated by Chinese military and civilian agencies.

Tankers

Technical research ships

Torpedo trials crafts

Tracking ships

Training Ships 
In addition to regular training ships, some retired warships are also converted as stationary training facilities at various military academies for active use, and thus remain on Chinese naval registry.

Tugs

UAV motherships

Unmanned surface vehicles (USV)
Just like most Chinese unmanned aerial vehicles (UAV)s are micro-UAVs, majority of Chinese USVs are micro USVs. For better efficiency, most USVs used by PLAN are owned by Chinese civilian governmental agencies or private firms contracted by PLAN to perform various logistic tasks such as maintenance, surveying and research missions.

Unmanned underwater vehicles (UUV)s
Many Chinese UUVs are either jointly owned and operated by PLA or owned by civilian agencies but tasked to carry out PLAN missions, and they are usually operated from Chinese ships flying civilian flags. Also, many PLAN logistic, scientific and construction projects are subcontracted out to Chinese civilian agencies and private firms that operate UUVs, and thus most UUVs used by PLAN are owned by Chinese civilian agencies and private firms. Just like most Chinese USVs are micro USVs, most Chinese UUVs are micro UUVs.

Autonomous underwater vehicles (AUV)s

Benthic landers

Bottom crawlers

Hybrid UUVs (Autonomous remotely-operated vehicles, ARVs)

Remotely operated underwater vehicle (ROUV)s

Underwater gliders

Wave gliders

Weapon trials ships

Decommissioned ships 
Decommissioned ships of PLAN only include those with every ship of the class has been struck from the Chinese naval registry, but do not include those classes with ships retired from frontline service and converted to auxiliaries, and thus still commissioned and thus remain on the Chinese naval registry.

Submarines
Soviet M-class submarines: 4 units include Pennant # 201 thru 204, respectively named as National Defense (Guofang, 国防) # 21 thru 24, which in turn, were ex-Soviet submarines M-276 thru 279 respectively.
Soviet S-class submarines:  4 units retired in 1963, including Pennant # 401 thru 404, respectively named as New China (Xin Zhong Guo 新中国) # 11 thru 14, which in turn, were ex-Soviet submarines S-52, 52, 24, 25 respectively.
Type 033G Wuhan class medium submarine and Type 033G1 Wuhan-A class cruise missile attack submarine
Type 6633/033/ES5A/ES5B Romeo-class submarines 
Type 030 submarine: never completed when cancelled in 1973 after construction begun in 1968.
Type 032 midget submarine: Converted to Type 032-1 prior to completion
Type 032-1 midget submarine:  The only unit built was retired in the 1970s.
Type 092 submarine: The sole unit of Type 092 nuclear powered ballistic submarine has been superseded by the much more advanced Type 094 submarine.
Type 6631 ballistic submarine: converted to Type 031 ballistic submarine in 1978.
Whiskey-class submarines: 5 units transferred from former-USSR and 21 domestically built units as Type 6603/03, all 26 have been retired.

Principal Surface Combatants
PLANS Changbai & Nanning, that were ex-ROCS Gu'an & Coastal Defense No 7, which in turn, were ex-Imperial Japanese Navy Ship (IJNS) Oki & Manju, 2 Etorofu-class escort ships. Used by PLAN as Coastal defence ships (CDS) & retired in 1982 & 1979 respectively.
PLANS Changsha, No 48, No 49, Jinan, Wuchang & Xi'an,  that were ex-ROCS Jie(接) 12, ex-Soviet CKP-48 corvette, ex-Soviet CKP-49 corvette, ex-ROCS Weihai, ex-ROCS Jinan, ex-ROCS Jie(接) 14, which in turn, were respectively IJNS No 118, No 142, No 76, No 194, No 14 & No 198 of Type D escort ship. Used by PLAN as CDS & retired in 1975, 1983, 1983, 1975 (sunk as a target), 1956 & 1975 respectively.
PLANS Chongqing, a light cruiser of ROCN of same name, which was ex-. Defected to PLA on February 25, 1949 and sunk by RoCAF in the following month.
PLANS Handan, Huaiyang (ship), Yancheng & Zunyi, all of them were Ruijin-class armed merchantman respectively converted from ex-Hoary stock, ex-Golden fragrant flower (金香花),  ex-Clove Flower & ex-Dezhou, all of which were cargo ships of US coastal freighter Design 330D.
PLANS Ji'an & Shenyang, which were ex-ROCS Ji'an & Huang'an, which in turn, were IJNS No 85 & 81 of Type C escort ships, Both were used by PLAN as CDS, with the former defected to PLA on April 23, 1949 and subsequently sunk by RoCAF on April 28, 1949, and the latter converted to acoustic research ship in 1966 after retired from the frontline service, and finally retired in 1980.
Retired in 1989.
PLANS Linyi, re-armed cargo ship He Le (和乐) converted from ex-. Retired in 1972.
PLANS Luoyang, re-armed cargo ship Xiang Xing (祥兴) converted from ex-. Retired in 1982.
PLANS Ruijin & Xingguo, 2 Ruijin-class armed merchantmen converted from ex-Jiang Tong (江通) & ex-Jiang Da (江达), 2 cargo ships of US coastal freighter Design 381. The first unit was the first ship in PLAN named “Ruijin”, & sunk by RoCAF P-47s in 1954.
Second PLAN ship named as Ruijin, used by PLAN as CDS & retired in 1990.
Type 6601/01/65/053H/053H2/053H2G frigates
Type 051D/051DT/051Z/051G/051G1/051G2 destroyers

Coastal & riverine warfare vessels
Beihai class gunboats: approximately two dozen built, all retired.
Huangpu class gunboats: including two 42-ton class (pennant # H846 & H847), eight 43-ton class, & 26 Type 52 gunboats.
PLANS Fu River, a gunboat that was ex-ROCS Jiang Xi (江犀), which in turn, was ex-Japanese gunboat Sumida (1939).
PLANS Guangzhou, re-armed cargo ship Yuan Pei (元培) converted from ex-. Retired in 1974.
PLANS gunboat No 3-522, which were ex-ROCS Wufeng (舞凤), which in turn, were ex-IJNS Maiko (舞子), which in turn, was NRP Macau, finally retired in 1968.
PLANS Min River, a gunboat that was ex-ROCS Changde, which in turn, was ex-Japanese gunboat Seta.
PLANS Nanchang, a gunboat that was ex-ROCS Changzhi, which in turn, was ex-Japanese gunboat Uji (1940). Retired in 1979.
PLANS Nen River, a gunboat that was ex-ROCS Yingde, which in turn, was ex-HMS Falcon (1931).
PLANS Nu River, a gunboat that was ex-ROCS Yingshan, which in turn, was ex-HMS Gannet (1927).
PLANS October & Vanguard, which were respectively ex-ROCS gunboat Guangguo (光国) & Gaoming (高明), which in turn, were IJNS No.1-class auxiliary submarine chasers No 220 & 223 respectively.
PLANS Pearl River, a gunboat that was ex-ROCN Yong'an, which in turn, was ex-Japanese gunboat Futami.
PLANS Sea Whale (Hai Jing, 海鲸), ex-ROCS No 101, an E-boat defected to PLA on April 23, 1949, converted to a training boat in 1951, retired in the 1960s.
PLANS Wu River, gunboat that was ex-ROCS Yong Ping (永平), which in turn, was ex-Japanese gunboat Atami.
PLANS Xiang Jiang (湘江), a gunboat that was ex-ROCS Yong Ji (永济), which in turn, was ex-Japanese gunboat Toba.
PLANS Yan'an, ex-ROCS Yong Ji (永绩), a Yongfeng-class gunboat. Sunk on June 19, 1965 as a target during AShM test. 
PLANS Yangtze, ex-ROCN Minquan, retired to a museum ship on August 1, 1978, scrapped in July 1981.Because in February 1952, Mao Zedong was on board for four days and three nights inspecting PLAN, a replica has built & displayed at Chinese naval museum in Qingdao.
PLANS Yichuan, ex-ROCS Chu Tong (楚同), a Chutai-class gunboat. Sunk in 1959 as a target in an AShM test. 
PLANS Yong Sui (永绥), ex-ROCS gunboat defected to PLA on April 23, 1949, and sunk five months later on September 23, 1949 by bombs dropped by RoCAF B-25s. 
Project 122bis submarine chasers with pennant # 611 to 616, respectively named as Dezhou, Jiaozhou, Changzhou, Tongzhou, Wenzhou & Taizhou, which were ex-Soviet BO-379/380/393/395/396/397 respectively.
Project 123K (P-4 class) torpedo boats: several dozen transferred from former-USSR.
Project 183T (P-8 class) torpedo boats: 1 unit transferred from former-USSR.
Project 201M SO-1 class submarine chaser: No 471 transferred from former-USSR to PLAN.
Project 205 (Osa I class) missile boats: 7 units transferred from former-USSR.
Type 027/027II/027IIB torpedo boats: include 1 hydrofoil equipped Type 027, 1 Type 027II with different steel used in construction, & 1 Type 027IIB entered service in January 1984.
Type 0101 gunboat
Type 0105 gunboats: 4 units total, all retired
Type 0108 gunboat: a single unit built & retired
Type 0109 gunboats: 10 units total, all retired
Type 0110 gunboats: 3 units built, all retired
Type 0112 gunboat: the single hydrofoil equipped gunboat has retired
Type 6602/02/7102II torpedo boats: including 24 Type 6602 & 63 Type 02 that included steel hulled Type 6702 & 7102II.
Type 6604 & 04 submarine chasers: domestically built ex-Soviet Project 123bis, slightly modified Chinese version totaling 18, with pennant # 601 to 606, 631 to 636, & 651 to 656.
Type 6621 missile boat: 122 units total, Chinese versions of Project 205 missile boat, all retired by June 2007.
Type 6623 & 023 missile boats: Chinese version of Project 183R missile boats: 8 Type 6623 built with former-USSR supplied parts, 2 more indigenously built by China itself.
Type 6624 missile boats: steel hulled Type 6623. A unit of Type 024, which is a development of Type 6624 with mast can be fold down for anchoring in bunkers, is kept as a museum ship.
Type 6625/025/026/026II/R704 torpedo boats: all models retired by 2014. 
Yulin-class gunboats

Amphibious warfare ships
LCI(L): captured from RoCN, & has since retired
LCT Mk 5 & Mk 6: captured from RoCN & both have since tired
LCU 1600 series: captured from RoCN & has since retired
LST-542 class: captured from RoCN & has since retired
 Songling LCAC has retired
Type 066/066K/066A Yuzhai class LCM: all have retired
Type 072 landing ship: has retired
Type 073 & Type 073II Yudao class landing ships: both have retired
Type 079I & Type 079II Yulian class landing ships: both have retired
Type 55 LCM has retired
Type 271I & Type 271II LCUs: both have retired
Type 363 & 363A LCM both have retired
Type 711 LCAC has retired
Type 716-I Dagu A class LCAC has retired
Type 716-II Dagu B class LCAC has retired
Type 722-I Jinsha I class LCAC has retired

Mine warfare vessels
PLANS minelayer No 800, ex-Soviet Minelayer No 50, which in turn, was ex-IJNS Katashima, a  Sokuten-class auxiliary minelayer (1913), retired in the early 1980s.
Project 254 (T43 class) sea-going minesweeper: all units have retired
Type 05 sea-going minesweeper: all units have retired
Type 057K Lianyun class gulf minesweeper: all units have retired
Type 058 riverine minesweeper: all 4 units have retired
Type 062 Fushun class minesweeper: all 20 units have retired
Type 918 Wolei class minelayer retired in 2012 & was transferred to China Coast Guard (CSG), becoming CSG cutter # 1212.
Type 6605 sea-going minesweeper: all 4 units have retired
Type 6610 sea-going minesweeper: all 4 units have retired
Type 7102 minesweeper: The single unit built has since retired

Naval auxiliaries
Dandao class cargo ship cargo ship: all units have retired
Danlin-class cargo ship: all units have retired
Galați-class cargo ship: all units have retired
Leizhou-class tanker: all units have retired
PLANS Autumn Wind (Qiu-Feng, or 秋风 in Chinese) degaussing/deperming ship converted from minesweeper has retired
PLANS Bei-Tuo 710: the 3rd & last unit of Type 830 tug has been transferred to China Marine Surveillance (CMS), becoming CMS cutter # 110.
PLANS Degaussing/Deperming 1 (Xiao-Ci 1, or消磁 1 in Chinese) degaussing/deperming ship has retired
PLANS Degaussing/Deperming 951 (Xiao-Ci 951, or 消磁 951) degaussing/deperming ship has retired
PLANS East Buoy (Dong-Biao, 东标 in Chinese) 263: This Type 744 buoy tender entered service in 1980 & has been transferred to civilian agency on August 1, 2015.
PLANS Mount Tai: The first Chinese submarine tender PLANS Mt Tai has retired in 1988.
PLANS Nan-Lan (南缆) 233 of Type 991 cable layer, retired & replaced by a Dong-Lan 885-class cable layer with the same pennant number/name.
PLANS No. 323 degaussing/deperming ship has retired
PLANS No. 629 degaussing/deperming ship has retired
PLANS No. 731 degaussing/deperming ship has retired
PLANS No. 744 degaussing/deperming ship has retired
PLANS Panlong (蟠龙) degaussing/deperming ship converted from minesweeper, which in turn, was converted from large infantry landing craft has retired
PLANS Sea Fishing 16 (Hai-Yu 16, 海渔 16 in Chinese) degaussing/deperming ship has retired
PLANS Sea Magnetism 802 (Hai-Ci 海磁 802 in Chinese) degaussing/deperming ship has retired
PLANS Zhangdian (张店) degaussing/deperming ship converted from minesweeper, which in turn, was converted from large infantry landing craft has retired
Qiongsha class troop ship Nan Yun 830 & 831 have been retired & replaced by new ships of Darong class with the same pennant number.
Chinese research ship Xiangyanghong 16: Collided with a Cypriot chemical tanker on May 2, 1993 and sunk, killing 3 crew members.
Shuguang class ocean surveillance ships : 2 Shuguang class with pennant # Beidiao (北调) 994 and Beidiao 998 have retired.
Type 64 demolition boat: all units have retired
Type 071/071A/071G Yanha class icebreakers: The sole unit Type 071 with Pennant # 722 retired on Jun 7, 2013. Type 071A was upgraded to Type 071G during midlife upgrade, and transferred to Chinese Coast Guard in 2013 to become an icebreaking tug.
Type 113 naval trawler
Type 210 icebreaker (Yanbing class): The sole unit with Pennant # 723 has been transferred to Chinese Coast Guard on November 20, 2012.
Type 308 demolition boat: all units have retired
Type 308II demolition boat: all units have retired
Type 595 ocean surveillance ship: 2 Type 595 AGOS Dongdiao (东调)223 Xiang-yang-hong (向阳红) No 4 and Nan-diao (南调) 485 Xiang-Yang-Hong No 6 have retired.
Type 601 degaussing/deperming ship: The single unit built (Hai-Ci 951, or 海磁 in Chinese, meaning Sea Magnetism 951) has retired
Type 614I & 614II weather ships, 614III oceanographic research ships: All units are either retired or transferred to Chinese Coast Guard.
Type 625 research vessel: All units are either retired or transferred to civilian agencies.
Type 626 Fuzhou-class tanker: all Fuzhou class tankers have been retired by the early 2020s.
Type 632 Fulin-class tanker: all Fulin class tankers have been retired by the early 2020s. 
Type 636 hydrographic survey ship: The sole unit of Type 636 was transferred to Chinese Coast Guard on December 11, 2012.
Type 701 roll-on/roll-off ship: After initially assigned to PLAN for extremely short period of time, the 1st unit was reassigned to PLAGF soon afterward, & all subsequent Type 701s have gone to PLAGF directly.
Type 744 buoy tender has been retired on Aug 1, 2015 & transferred to civilian service.
Type 801 naval trawler: All units have retired
Type 810 target boat: all units have retired
Type 813 spy ship: Transferred to Chinese Coast Guard and converted to PRCCGS # 3469 cutter.
Type 890 cable layers: all 4 units have been transferred to PLAGF.
Type 905 replenishment tanker: 4 units total, with # 881 Hongze Lake, # 882 Poyang Lake retired in 2018 and 2020 respectively, # 950 retired and sold to civilian as oil tanker Hailang in 1989. # 871 sold to Pakistan in 1987,  becoming PNS Nasr. 
Type 922 rescue and salvage ship: the single unit built was transferred to Chinese Coast Guard and became Chinese Coast Guard cutter # 3411.
Type 985 buoy tenders: all units were transferred from PLAN to Ministry of Transport of the People's Republic of China (MOT) in the early 1980s when maritime navigational responsibility was transferred from the former to the latter.
Type 991I cable layer: the sole unit has been transferred to civilian agency.
Type 994 buoy tenders: all units were transferred from PLAN to MOT in the early 1980s when maritime navigational responsibility was transferred from the former to the latter.
Xiang-Yang-Hong 5 ocenographic research ship has retired in 1993.
Yanding-class transport: Transport of this class were derived from fishing trawlers, & all 4 units including Dong-Yun (东运) 456, Dong-Yun (东运) 520, Dong-Yun (东运) 523, Dong-Yun (东运) 666 have retired.
Yanfang class degaussing/deperming ship: Both units have retired
Yerka class degaussing/deperming ship: Both units have retired

See also
 People's Liberation Army 
 People's Liberation Army Navy
 People's Liberation Army Navy Surface Force - Further details on the surface ships of the PLAN
 People's Liberation Army Navy Submarine Force - Further details on the submarines of the PLAN
 Naval weaponry of the People's Liberation Army Navy
 List of active People's Liberation Army Navy landing craft - For details on the landing craft of the PLAN

Notes

References

Bibliography

Further reading
 Congressional Research Service: China Naval Modernization: Implications for U.S. Navy Capabilities—Background and Issues for Congress. Ronald O'Rourke (Specialist in Naval Affairs). Published 23 December 2014

External links
 Navy 360: A comprehensive overview of PLAN naval ships, both past and present (in Chinese)  (haijun360.com/)
 Global Security: Chinese Warships (globalsecurity.org)

Ships of the People's Liberation Army Navy
Submarines of the People's Liberation Army Navy
China
Lists of ships of China
China
Ships